Temple Adas Israel is a historic synagogue located at the intersection of Washington and College streets in Brownsville, West Tennessee. Built in 1882 by German Jewish immigrants and descendants, it is the oldest synagogue building in Tennessee and one of fewer than one hundred surviving 19th-century synagogues in the country. On January 19, 1979, Temple Adas Israel was added to the National Register of Historic Places.

History

Brownsville's Jewish community began when two German Ashkenazim immigrants, brothers Joe and Sol Sternberger, founded the Adas Israel Congregation in 1867. As immigrants to the United States, the Sternbergers had brought a Torah written on sheepskin. Led by Isaac Levi, the Orthodox community first met for prayers in the home of Jacob and Karoline Felsenthal. Over the next fifteen years, members of Adas Israel moved toward Reform Judaism and membership grew to 25 families.

In 1878, the congregation founded Adas Israel Cemetery, a Jewish burial ground still in use today. The congregation became too large to continue meeting in local homes. They built a 200-seat wooden synagogue in 1882. A large ceremony took place on March 2, 1882 for the synagogue's dedication. Attendees included many of the city's non-Jews as well as members of the congregation. Emil Tamm became the first lay leader of the congregation in its new temple.

The Adas Israel congregation has never had a full-time rabbi. Lay leaders have included Abe Sternberger, Morton Felsenthal, Fred Silverstein, and Fred Silverstein, Jr. In the late 1970s, Carolyn Celia Key Raney, great-great-granddaughter of Isaac Levi, served as a lay reader, standing in for Morton Felsenthal during his one-year leave of absence. She re-established the Temple's Sunday school.

During the late 20th century, the congregation's membership began to decline as families moved to larger cities. In the early 21st century, about 12 families attend Sabbath services on Friday night at Temple Adas Israel.

Architecture

Temple Adas Israel is a modest example of Gothic Revival architecture and was modeled after the United Hebrew Congregation Temple in Louisville, Kentucky. It originally featured a small steeple, an extremely rare feature for a synagogue.

A particularly beautiful suite of thirteen stained glass windows, arched in Gothic style, were installed in 1910. The window above the Torah ark is unusual in a synagogue as it depicts a large, realistic human eye, similar to the Eye of Providence found on the one-dollar bill and in Masonic iconography.

The building underwent a major renovation in the 1920s; the wooden siding was replaced with brick, the steeple was removed, and new pews and an organ were installed.

References

Further reading

External links
 
 Brownsville TN in Encyclopedia of Southern Jewish Communities
 
 

Synagogues completed in 1882
German-Jewish culture in the United States
German-American culture in Tennessee
Gothic Revival synagogues
Buildings and structures in Haywood County, Tennessee
Reform synagogues in Tennessee
Religious organizations established in 1867
Synagogues on the National Register of Historic Places in Tennessee

Jewish cemeteries in Tennessee
1867 establishments in Tennessee
Gothic Revival architecture in Tennessee